Spinicalliotropis ericius is a species of sea snail, a marine gastropod mollusk in the family Eucyclidae.

Description
The shell can grow to be 4.7 mm.

Distribution
It can be found in the Mozambique Channel and the French island of Réunion.

References

 Vilvens C. (2007) New records and new species of Calliotropis from Indo-Pacific. Novapex 8 (Hors Série 5): 1–72.

External links
 Kano, Y.; Chikyu, E.; Warén, A. (2009). Morphological, ecological and molecular characterization of the enigmatic planispiral snail genus Adeuomphalus (Vetigastropoda: Seguenzioidea. Journal of Molluscan Studies. 75(4): 397-418.

ericius
Gastropods described in 2006